DFSB Kollective is a South Korean agency specializing in the distribution of K-pop songs worldwide.

Overview 
According to Canadian Music Week, DFSB Kollective was responsible for organizing the first sold-out K-Pop concert tour in the United States. It also distributes many K-Pop albums in North America and has rolled out over 250 K-Pop artists into digital music stores and sites.

According to Time magazine, DFSB Kollective is the first worldwide distributor of K-pop songs on iTunes.

Lawsuits 
In 2012, the agency filed a copyright-infringement claim against an Australian internet user for "unauthorized download".

In early 2013, DFSB Kollective sued two webmasters for illegally uploading its music onto several blog sites.

In October 2015, DFSB Kollective sued Korean entertainment giant CJ E&M for copyright infringement. The suit was the biggest copyright infringement case of 2015 in the US based on monetary damages sought.

External links 

 An interview with DFSB Kollective president Bernie Cho on Notebook on Cities and Culture

See also
 Seoulsonic

References 

K-pop
South Korean music industry
South Korean record labels